John Jameson may refer to:

John Jameson, businessman and whiskey distiller, founder of Jameson Irish Whiskey
John Jameson (politician) (1802–1857), American lawyer and Congressman from Missouri
John Jameson (colonel) (1751–1810), Continental Army soldier who helped discover Benedict Arnold's treason
John Jameson (character), fictional Marvel character known as "the Man-Wolf"
John Jameson (cricketer) (born 1941), English cricketer
Johnny Jameson (born 1948), Northern Irish footballer
John Gordon Jameson (1878–1955), British Member of Parliament for Edinburgh West, 1918–1922
John Eustace Jameson (1853–1919), Member of Parliament for West Clare, 1895–1906
John Paul Jameson (died 1700)

See also 
 Jameson (name)